Franz R. Friedl (born 30 May 1892 in Oberkappel, Upper Austria, Austria-Hungary; died 5 December 1977 in Berlin), was an Austrian violist, composer and film composer.
The son of a cooper he attended grammar school and then received artistic training from Rosé and Carl Flesch. Friedl then worked as concertmaster in Dortmund and Dresden. From 1923 to 1926 Franz Friedl was principal violist at the Teatro Colón in Buenos Aires, since 1927 the Upper Austrian, worked as a composer and composed chamber music, overtures. From 1933 he was music composer for theatre and films. He is listed on some recordings as the conductor of the "Berlin Symphony Orchestra", a pseudonym of an unidentified ensemble, but it is doubtful whether he actually was the conductor. From 1940-1945 he was musical director of Die Deutsche Wochenschau. The grandchild of his only daughter is Björn Stenvers.

Film scores

1932 Das Testament des Dr. Mabuse
1933 Rivalen der Luft
1933 Von Gemsen und Steinböcken
1933 Aus der Heimat des Elchs
1933 Tierbilder aus den finnischen Wäldern
1933 Affenstreiche
1933 Kraftleistungen der Pflantzen
1934 Wilhelm Tell
1934 Schloß Hubertus
1935 Frischer Wind aus Kanada
1935 Stützen der Gesellschaft
1935 Die Heilige und ihr Narr
1936 Flitterwochen
1936 Annemarie, the story of young love
1938 Es leuchten die Sterne
1938 Liebelei und Liebe
1938 Rätsel der Urwaldhölle
1938 Der Edelweißkönig
1939 Arinka (USSR, Lenfilm)
1939 Das Ekel
1940 Kampf um Norwegen
1940 Der ewige Jude
1949 (UA 1950) Ruf an das Gewissen
1949 Quartett zu fünft
1950 Leben aus dem Teich
1950 Bürgermeisterin Anna
1951 Berlin kommt wieder
1951 Zugverkehr unregelmäßig
1951 Es geht nicht ohne Gisela
1957 Kanaillen

Selected compositions
Blaue Mondnacht am Amazonas, Tanzorchester Erhard Bauschke (Gr. 10704 / 7477 1/2 GR (1937)
Tanz der Masken, Ballett-Fantasie für großes Orchester
Prolog, für großes Orchester
Tänzerisches Capriccio, für Orchester
Beethoven: Symphony No. 3 in F Flat "Eroica" Op. 55, Berlin Symphony Orchestra (1952)
Brahms: Symphony No. 3 in F Major, Op. 90, Berlin Symphony Orchestra (1953)
The Brahms Symphony No. 4 on Royale 1239, Berlin Symphony Orchestra (1954)
La Danza, Fritz Wunderlich, Ein Unvergessener Tenor (1969)

Bibliography

External links
 

1892 births
1977 deaths
20th-century Austrian composers
20th-century classical composers
Austrian classical composers
Austrian film score composers
Austrian male classical composers
Austrian emigrants to Germany
20th-century violinists
People from Rohrbach District
Austrian violinists